John Perkins House may refer to:

 John Perkins House (Castine, Maine), listed on the National Register of Historic Places in Hancock County, Maine
 John Perkins House (Wenham, Massachusetts), listed on the NRHP in Essex County, Massachusetts

See also
Perkins House (disambiguation)